Submarine Base is a 1943 American film directed by Albert H. Kelley for Producers Releasing Corporation. The working title was Raiders of the Pacific.

Plot
Ship engineer Jim Taggert is rescued from a torpedoed tramp steamer by Joe Morgan, an American gangster that found New York too hot for him, and has become a fisherman operating from an out-of-the-way island off of the coast of South America. Morgan makes his headquarters at the Halfway House run by the parents of Maria Styx as a bar and dance resort catering to the planters and traders of the island. Taggert finds himself practically a prisoner along with a group of American girls acting as entertainers at the resort. Taggert shadows Morgan in his activities in a remote cove and finds that Morgan is supplying German U-boat commanders with torpedoes, but does not know that Morgan has rigged the torpedoes with clock devices that explode when at sea and sinks the U-boats.

Cast
John Litel as James Xavier "Jim" Taggart
Alan Baxter as Joe Morgan
Eric Blore as Spike, Morgan's aide
Georges Metaxa as Nazi Agent Anton Kroll
George Flaherty as David Cavanaugh
Rafael Storm as Felipo
Fifi D'Orsay as Maria Styx
Iris Adrian as Dorothy
Jacqueline Dalya as Judy Pierson
Anna Demetrio as Angela Styx
Luis Alberni as Mr. Styx
Lucien Prival as German Submarine Captain Mueller

References

External links 

1943 films
American black-and-white films
Films directed by Albert H. Kelley
Films set in South America
Films set on islands
Producers Releasing Corporation films
World War II films made in wartime
World War II submarine films
American war drama films
1940s war drama films
1943 drama films
1940s English-language films